Gaston Mayordomo (16 January 1923 – 23 July 2005) was a French middle-distance runner. He competed in the men's 800 metres at the 1948 Summer Olympics.

References

1923 births
2005 deaths
Athletes (track and field) at the 1948 Summer Olympics
French male middle-distance runners
Olympic athletes of France
Place of birth missing